Jumbo Video is a Canadian brand of franchised video stores. The brand is owned by Le SuperClub Vidéotron, a division of Quebecor Media, which maintained corporate-owned stores until 2018.

The company was founded in May 1987 and at one point claimed to be the third-largest player in the Canadian video rental industry. It was well known for offering free popcorn to customers, regardless of whether they rented videos. Their video game subsidiary Microplay was founded in 1986, and purchased by Jumbo Video in the late 1990s in order to facilitate the rentals of video games.

In 2004, due to financial issues that had been prevalent for many years, the assets of the chain were purchased by Quebecor Media, resulting in the re-branding of the stores with the current logo, and now Jumbo Video is now essentially the English Canadian brand of SuperClub, Quebec's dominant video rental chain, and the two brands now share similar marketing. As a result of the 2011-12 closures of Blockbuster Canada and Rogers Video, SuperClub and Jumbo together form Canada's largest remaining video rental chain.

As of early 2015, the Jumbo Video website listed 11 locations, five located in Ontario and the other six in various communities in Atlantic Canada. While all of them are closed, two remaining Jumbo Video stores remain open in Belleville and London. They are family-owned and are combined with Microplay stores. In addition to media rentals and sales, the store includes many varieties of popcorn, single-serve coffee, collectible toys (such as trading cards, figurines, and plushies), and other merchandise. The Belleville location reopened under new management in December 2022, making Jumbo Video one of the few surviving major video store brands, alongside Le SuperClub Vidéotron in Québec and the last Blockbuster in Bend, Oregon, United States.

The chain was previously publicly traded as a company called Jumbo Entertainment Inc. After selling its assets to Quebecor, the remaining shell company agreed to a reverse takeover by clothing retailer West 49.

Slogans
 "Home of Free Popcorn!" (1990-1998)
 "Home of the guarantee." (1998-2005)
 "Tons of copies!" (2006-2018)

References

External links
 Official Website

Quebecor
Retail companies established in 1987
Retail companies disestablished in 2018
1987 establishments in Quebec
2018 disestablishments in Quebec
Video rental services of Canada